Barling could refer to one of the following places:

Barling, Essex, England
Barling, Arkansas, United States
Barlings, Lincolnshire, England

Other uses
Barling (surname)